Alberto Pappiani (1709–1790) was an Italian mathematician, astronomer, and theologian.

He was a Piarist priest, and teacher of philosophy and mathematics in the Florentine College.

In 1758 he became president of the Academy of Dogmatic Theologians in Florence.

Works

References 

1709 births
1790 deaths
18th-century Italian astronomers
18th-century Italian mathematicians
18th-century Italian Roman Catholic theologians
Piarists